Michael "The Scholar" DeVito (born 1961) is a competitive eater and hot dog eating champion, and three-time winner of the Nathan's Hot Dog Eating Contest (in 1990, 1993 and 1994). "Mr. DeVito ate 20 hot dogs yesterday at the annual July 4th hot dog-eating contest on Coney Island, assuring him victory for the fourth time in five years." DeVito is 6 feet 2 inches and weighs just over 200 pounds (pre-competition). He set a personal best, eating 20 hot dogs, buns included, in the standard 12-minute competition period. DeVito, who goes by "Mike" when not competitive eating, uses "The Scholar" moniker during competitions; he "earned his nickname because of his scholarly approach to the game of champions."

DeVito is a resident of Manalapan Township, New Jersey.

He also works as an accountant.

References

1961 births
Living people
American competitive eaters
People from Manalapan Township, New Jersey
American people of Italian descent
American accountants